Renata Chilewska is a Paralympian athlete from Poland competing mainly in the throwing events.

She competed in the 1992 Summer Paralympics in Barcelona, Spain. There she won a silver medal in the women's C5-C8 javelin throw and failed to medal in the C5-C8 shot put and discus throw events

It was then 12 years before she returned to the Paralympics stage with an appearance at the 2004 Summer Paralympics in Athens, Greece where she won a gold medal in the F35-38 javelin throw, a silver medal in the F35/36 shot put and a bronze medal in the F35/36/38 discus throw.

She didn't leave it as long to compete in her third games when competed in the 2008 Summer Paralympics in Beijing, China. There she won a bronze medal in the women's F35-36 shot put and the women's F35-38 javelin throw. But failed to medal in the F35/36 discus.

External links
 

Paralympic athletes of Poland
Athletes (track and field) at the 1992 Summer Paralympics
Athletes (track and field) at the 2004 Summer Paralympics
Athletes (track and field) at the 2008 Summer Paralympics
Paralympic gold medalists for Poland
Paralympic silver medalists for Poland
Paralympic bronze medalists for Poland
Living people
Place of birth missing (living people)
World record holders in Paralympic athletics
Medalists at the 1992 Summer Paralympics
Medalists at the 2004 Summer Paralympics
Medalists at the 2008 Summer Paralympics
Athletes (track and field) at the 2012 Summer Paralympics
Year of birth missing (living people)
Paralympic medalists in athletics (track and field)
20th-century Polish women
21st-century Polish women